The red squirrel (Sciurus vulgaris) is a species of tree squirrel in the genus Sciurus common throughout Europe and Asia. The red squirrel is an arboreal, primarily herbivorous rodent.

In Great Britain, Ireland, and in Italy numbers have decreased drastically in recent years. This decline is associated with the introduction by humans of the eastern grey squirrel (Sciurus carolinensis) from North America. However, the population in Scotland is stabilising due to conservation efforts, awareness and the increasing population of the pine marten, a European predator that selectively controls grey squirrels.

Description

Males and females are the same size.

The long tail helps the squirrel to balance and steer when jumping from tree to tree and running along branches and may keep the animal warm during sleep.

The red squirrel, like most tree squirrels, has sharp curved claws to help it to climb and descend broad tree trunks, thin branches, and even house walls. Its strong hind legs let it leap gaps between trees. The red squirrel also can swim.

The coat of the red squirrel varies in colour with time of year and location. There are several coat colour morphs ranging from black to red. Red coats are most common in Great Britain; in other parts of Europe and Asia different coat colours coexist within populations, much like hair colour in some human populations. The underside of the squirrel is always white-cream in colour. The red squirrel sheds its coat twice a year, switching from a thinner summer coat to a thicker, darker winter coat with noticeably larger ear-tufts (a prominent distinguishing feature of this species) between August and November. A lighter, redder overall coat colour, along with the ear-tufts (in adults) and smaller size, distinguish the Eurasian red squirrel from the American eastern grey squirrel. The red colour is for camouflage when seen against the bark of pine trees.

Distribution and habitat

Red squirrels occupy boreal, coniferous woods in northern Europe and Siberia, preferring Scots pine, Norway spruce and Siberian pine. In western and southern Europe they are found in broad-leaved woods where the mixture of tree and shrub species provides a better year-round source of food. In most of the British Isles and in Italy, broad-leaved woodlands are now less suitable due to the better competitive feeding strategy of introduced grey squirrels.

Ecology and behaviour

The red squirrel is found in both coniferous forest and temperate broadleaf woodlands. The squirrel makes a drey (nest) out of twigs in a branch-fork, forming a domed structure about 25 to 30 cm in diameter. This is lined with moss, leaves, grass and bark. Tree hollows and woodpecker holes are also used. The red squirrel is a solitary animal and is shy and reluctant to share food with others. However, outside the breeding season and particularly in winter, several red squirrels may share a drey to keep warm. Social organization is based on dominance hierarchies within and between sexes; although males are not necessarily dominant to females, the dominant animals tend to be larger and older than subordinate animals, and dominant males tend to have larger home ranges than subordinate males or females.

The red squirrel eats mostly the seeds of trees, neatly stripping conifer cones to get at the seeds within,fungi, nuts (especially hazelnuts but also beech, chestnuts and acorns), berries, vegetables, garden flowers, tree sap and young shoots.
More rarely, red squirrels may also eat bird eggs or nestlings. A Swedish study shows that out of 600 stomach contents of red squirrels examined, only 4 contained remnants of birds or eggs.

Excess food is put into caches, either buried or in nooks or holes in trees, and eaten when food is scarce. Although the red squirrel remembers where it created caches at a better-than-chance level, its spatial memory is substantially less accurate and durable than that of grey squirrels.
Between 60% and 80% of its active period may be spent foraging and feeding. The active period for the red squirrel is in the morning and in the late afternoon and evening. It often rests in its nest in the middle of the day, avoiding the heat and the high visibility to birds of prey that are dangers during these hours. During the winter, this mid-day rest is often much briefer, or absent entirely, although harsh weather may cause the animal to stay in its nest for days at a time.

No territories are claimed between the red squirrels, and the feeding areas of individuals overlap considerably.

Reproduction

Mating can occur in late winter during February and March and in summer between June and July. Up to two litters a year per female are possible. Each litter averages three young, called kits. Gestation is about 38 to 39 days. The young are looked after by the mother alone and are born helpless, blind, and deaf. They weigh between 10 and 15  g. Their body is covered by hair at 21 days, their eyes and ears open after three to four weeks, and they develop all their teeth by 42 days. Juvenile red squirrels can eat solids around 40 days following birth and from that point can leave the nest on their own to find food; however, they still suckle from their mother until weaning occurs at 8 to 10 weeks.

During mating, males detect females that are in oestrus by an odour that they produce, and although there is no courtship, the male will chase the female for up to an hour prior to mating. Usually, several males will chase a single female until the dominant male, usually the largest in the group, mates with the female. Males and females will mate several times with many partners. Females must reach a minimum body mass before they enter oestrus, and heavy females on average produce more young. If food is scarce breeding may be delayed. Typically a female will produce her first litter in her second year.

Life expectancy  

Red squirrels that survive their first winter have a life expectancy of 3 years. Individuals may reach 7 years of age, and 10 in captivity. Survival is positively related to the availability of autumn-winter tree seeds; on average, 75–85% of juveniles die during their first winter, and mortality is approximately 50% for winters following the first.

Enemies and threats
Arboreal predators include small mammals such as the pine marten, wildcats and the stoat, which preys on nestlings; birds, including owls and raptors such as the goshawk and buzzards, may also take the red squirrel. The red fox, cats and dogs can prey upon the red squirrel when it is on the ground. Humans influence the population size and mortality of the red squirrel by destroying or altering habitats, by causing road casualties, and by introducing non-native populations of the North American eastern grey squirrels.

The eastern grey squirrel and the red squirrel are not directly antagonistic, and violent conflict between these species is not a factor in the decline in red squirrel populations. However, the eastern grey squirrel appears to be able to decrease the red squirrel population due to several reasons:
The eastern grey squirrel carries a disease, the squirrel parapoxvirus, that does not appear to affect their own health but will often kill the red squirrel. It was revealed in 2008 that the numbers of red squirrels at Formby (England) had declined by 80% as a result of this disease, though the population is now recovering.
The eastern grey squirrel can better digest acorns, while the red squirrel cannot access the proteins and fats in acorns as easily.
When the red squirrel is put under pressure, it will not breed as often.

In the UK, due to the above circumstances, the population has today fallen to 160,000 red squirrels or fewer (120,000 of these are in Scotland). Outside the UK and Ireland, the impact of competition from the eastern grey squirrel has been observed in Piedmont, Italy, where two pairs escaped from captivity in 1948. A significant drop in red squirrel populations in the area has been observed since 1970, and it is feared that the eastern grey squirrel may expand into the rest of Europe.

Conservation
The red squirrel is protected in most of Europe, as it is listed in Appendix III of the Bern Convention; it is listed as being of least concern on the IUCN Red List. However, in some areas it is abundant and is hunted for its fur.

Although not thought to be under any threat worldwide, the red squirrel has nevertheless drastically reduced in number in the United Kingdom; especially after the grey squirrels were introduced from North America in the 1870s. Fewer than 140,000 individuals are thought to be left in 2013; approximately 85% of which are in Scotland, with the Isle of Wight being the largest haven in England. A local charity, the Wight Squirrel Project,  supports red squirrel conservation on the island, and islanders are actively recommended to report any invasive greys. The population decrease in Britain is often ascribed to the introduction of the eastern grey squirrel from North America, but the loss and fragmentation of its native woodland habitat has also played a significant role.

In contrast, the red squirrel may present a threat if introduced to regions outside its native range. It is classed as a "prohibited new organism" under New Zealand's Hazardous Substances and New Organisms Act 1996 preventing it from being imported into the country.

Projects

In January 1998, eradication of the non-native North American grey squirrel began on the North Wales island of Anglesey. This facilitated the natural recovery of the small remnant red squirrel population. It was followed by the successful reintroduction of the red squirrel into the pine stands of Newborough Forest. Subsequent reintroductions into broadleaved woodland followed and today the island has the single largest red squirrel population in Wales. Brownsea Island in Poole Harbour is also populated exclusively by red rather than grey squirrels (approximately 200 individuals).

Mainland initiatives in southern Scotland and the north of England also rely upon grey squirrel control as the cornerstone of red squirrel conservation strategy. A local programme known as the "North East Scotland Biodiversity Partnership", an element of the national Biodiversity Action Plan was established in 1996. This programme is administered by the Grampian Squirrel Society, with an aim of protecting the red squirrel; the programme centres on the Banchory and Cults areas. In 2008, the Scottish Wildlife Trust announced a four-year project which commenced in the spring of 2009 called "Saving Scotland's Red Squirrels".

Other notable projects include red squirrel projects in the Greenfield Forest, including the buffer zones of Mallerstang, Garsdale and Widdale; the Northumberland Kielder Forest Project; and within the National Trust reserve in Formby. These projects were originally part of the Save Our Squirrels campaign that aimed to protect red squirrels in the north of England, but now form part of a five-year Government-led partnership conservation project called "Red Squirrels Northern England" to undertake grey squirrel control in areas important for red squirrels.

On the Isle of Wight, local volunteers are encouraged to record data on the existing red squirrel population, and to monitor it for the presence of invasive greys; as the red squirrel is still dominant on the island, these volunteers are also requested to cull any greys they find. In order to protect existing populations, increasing amounts of legislation have been issued to prevent the further release and expansion of grey squirrel populations. Under the Wildlife and Countryside Act 1981, it is an offense to release captured grey squirrels, indicating that any captured individuals must be culled. Additional rules covered under the WCA's Schedules 5 and 6 include limitations on the keeping of red squirrels in captivity, and also prohibits the culling of red squirrels.

Research undertaken in 2007 in the UK credits the pine marten with reducing the population of the invasive eastern grey squirrel. Where the range of the expanding pine marten population meets that of the eastern grey squirrel, the population of these squirrels retreats. It is theorised that, because the grey squirrel spends more time on the ground than the red, they are far more likely to come in contact with this predator.

During October 2012, four male and one female red squirrel, on permanent loan from the British Wildlife Centre, were transported to Tresco in the Isles of Scilly by helicopter, and released into Abbey Wood, near the Abbey Gardens. Only two survived and a further 20 were transported and released in October 2013. Although the red squirrel is not indigenous to the Isles of Scilly, those who supported this work intend to use Tresco as a ″safe haven″ for the endangered mammal, as the islands are free of predators such as foxes, and of the squirrel pox-carrying grey squirrel.

Historical, cultural and financial significance

Squirrel Nutkin is a character, always illustrated as a red squirrel, in English author Beatrix Potter's books for children.

"Ekorren" (The Squirrel) is a well-known and appreciated children's song in Sweden. Text and lyrics by Alice Tegnér in 1892.

Charles Dennim, protagonist of Geoffrey Household's novel Watcher in the Shadows, is a zoologist who studies and writes about red squirrels.

In Norse mythology, Ratatoskr is a red squirrel who runs up and down with messages in the world tree, Yggdrasil, and spreads gossip. In particular, he carried messages between the unnamed eagle at the top of Yggdrasill and the wyrm Níðhöggr beneath its roots.

The red squirrel used to be widely hunted for its pelt. In Finland, squirrel pelts were used as currency in ancient times, before the introduction of coinage. The expression "squirrel pelt" is still widely understood there to be a reference to money.  It has been suggested that the trade in red squirrel fur, highly prized in the medieval period and intensively traded, may have been responsible for the leprosy epidemic in medieval Europe. Within Great Britain, widespread leprosy is found early in East Anglia, to which many of the squirrel furs were traded, and the strain is the same as that found in modern red squirrels on Brownsea Island.

The red squirrel is the national mammal of Denmark.

Red squirrels are a common feature in English heraldry, where they are always depicted sitting up and often in the act of cracking a nut.

Taxonomy

There have been over 40 described subspecies of the red squirrel, but the taxonomic status of some of these is uncertain. A study published in 1971 recognises 16 subspecies and has served as a basis for subsequent taxonomic work. Although the validity of some subspecies is labelled with uncertainty because of the large variation in red squirrels even within a single region, others are relatively distinctive and one of these, S. v. meridionalis of South Italy, was elevated to species status as the Calabrian black squirrel in 2017. At present, there are 23 recognized subspecies of the red squirrel. Genetic studies indicate that another, S. v. hoffmanni of Sierra Espuña in southeast Spain (below included in S. v. alpinus), deserves recognition as distinct.

S. v. alpinus. Desmarest, 1822. (synonyms: S. v. baeticus, hoffmanni, infuscatus, italicus, numantius and segurae)
S. v. altaicus. Serebrennikov, 1928.
S. v. anadyrensis. Ognev, 1929.
S. v. arcticus. Trouessart, 1906. (synonym: S. v. jacutensis)
S. v. balcanicus. Heinrich, 1936. (synonyms: S. v. istrandjae and rhodopensis)
S. v. chiliensis. Sowerby, 1921.
S. v. cinerea. Hermann, 1804.
S. v. dulkeiti. Ognev, 1929.
S. v. exalbidus. Pallas, 1778. (synonyms: S. v. argenteus and kalbinensis)
S. v. fedjushini. Ognev, 1935.
S. v. formosovi. Ognev, 1935.
S. v. fuscoater. Altum, 1876. (synonyms: S. v. brunnea, gotthardi, graeca, nigrescens, russus and rutilans)
S. v. fusconigricans. Dvigubsky, 1804
S. v. leucourus. Kerr, 1792.
S. v. lilaeus. Miller, 1907. (synonyms: S. v. ameliae and croaticus)
S. v. mantchuricus. Thomas, 1909. (synonyms: S. v. coreae and coreanus)
S. v. martensi. Matschie, 1901. (synonym: S. v. jenissejensis)
S. v. ognevi. Migulin, 1928. (synonyms: S. v. bashkiricus, golzmajeri and uralensis)
S. v. orientis. Thomas, 1906. Ezo Red Squirrel (Hokkaidō).
S. v. rupestris. Thomas, 1907
S. v. ukrainicus. Migulin, 1928. (synonym: S. v. kessleri)
S. v. varius. Gmelin, 1789.
S. v. vulgaris. Linnaeus, 1758. (synonyms: S. v. albonotatus, albus, carpathicus, europaeus, niger, rufus and typicus)

References

External links

ARKive: photographs and videos
A partnership to save the red squirrel, between the Scottish Wildlife Trust, et al.
WildlifeOnline: Natural History of Tree Squirrels
Red squirrels make a comeback as culling of grey rivals brings results
Acute Fatal Toxoplasmosis in Three Eurasian Red Squirrels

Mammals described in 1758
Rodents of Europe
Mammals of Azerbaijan
Mammals of Mongolia
Mammals of Korea
Mammals of China
Mammals of Saint Kitts and Nevis
Mammals of the Caribbean
Sciurus
Articles containing video clips
Taxa named by Carl Linnaeus